Richard Phillip Ieyoub, Sr. (born August 11, 1944) is an American attorney and politician from the state of Louisiana. He served as the attorney general of Louisiana from 1992 to 2004.

Ieyoub's father, Philip, emigrated from Lebanon to Lake Charles, Louisiana, and his mother, Virginia, was a first-generation Lebanese American.

Ieyoub was inducted into the Louisiana Political Museum and Hall of Fame in 2016.

References

External links
Ieyoub and Jefferson weigh political futures - 8/18/2005, source unknown

State Attorney General Actions, the Tobacco Litigation, and the Doctrine of Parens Patriae - Working abstract by Theodore Eisenburg and Richard Ieyoub
Richard Ieyoub envisions NASCAR gold - Capitol Watch, 9/5/03

Who's Who in America, 2006

1944 births
American legal scholars
American politicians of Lebanese descent
District attorneys in Louisiana
Living people
Louisiana Attorneys General
Louisiana Democrats
Louisiana State University alumni
McNeese State University alumni
Politicians from Baton Rouge, Louisiana
Politicians from Lake Charles, Louisiana